The 2000 Indonesian census was held on 30 June 2000, and recorded a population of 203 million people within the country. However, a revised figure of 206,264,595 people was the official result. In some provinces, estimates were made, like the notably then-secessionist Aceh, and the census was criticized internationally for significant underreporting.

The census also recorded ethnicity. A total of 101 ethnic groups were identified officially, but the real number was estimated to be in the thousands.

Province rankings

Notes

External links
 
 
 

Population census, 2000
Population census
Government of Indonesia
2000 censuses